Scully is the surname of:

People
 Carl Scully, Australian former politician
 Cornelius D. Scully, American politician, mayor of Pittsburgh
 Frank Scully, American journalist and UFO author
 Frank Scully (politician), Australian politician
 Gary Scully (1933–2011), Australian journalist and foreign correspondent
 Hugh Scully, British TV presenter
 James Scully, American actor
 John Patrick Scully, veteran journalist (BBC, CBC, TVNZ), author of Am I Dead Yet? a journalist's perspective on terror
 Marlan Scully, American physicist
 Matthew Scully, American journalist and speechwriter
 Maurice Scully, Irish poet
 Mike Scully, American television producer
 Pat Scully, Irish football player and manager
 Paul Scully, British Conservative Party politician, Member of Parliament
 Paul Scully (Australian politician), NSW Labor party politician
 Peter Scully, Australian criminal
 Robert Guy Scully, Canadian television producer and host
 Robert Scully (footballer), Malaysian former soccer player and coach
 Rock Scully, manager of the Grateful Dead
 Samantha Scully, American actress
 Sean Scully, Irish-American painter
 Sean Scully (actor), Australian actor
 Steve Scully, American journalist
 Terry Scully, British actor
 Thomas A. Scully, American healthcare administrator
 Thomas J. Scully, U.S. Congressmen for the state of New Jersey
 Vin Scully, American sportscaster
 Vincent J. Scully, architectural history professor and writer
 William Scully (disambiguation), several people

Fictional characters
 Dana Scully, on the American TV series The X-Files
 Felicity Scully, on the Australian soap opera Neighbours
 Francis Scully, title character of Scully, a British television programme broadcast on Channel 4
 Jack Scully, on Neighbours
 Sgt. Jack Scully, a recurring character on the American TV series M*A*S*H
 Jake Scully, protagonist of the 1984 American film Body Double
 Joe Scully, on Neighbours
 Lyn Scully, on Neighbours
 Michelle Scully, on Neighbours
 Norm Scully, on Brooklyn Nine-Nine
 Oscar Scully, on Neighbours

See also
 Sculley (surname)
 Skully (disambiguation), includes those with given name and surname Skully

Surnames of Irish origin